Taizhou South railway station is a freight-only railway station located in Luqiao District, Taizhou, Zhejiang, China. It was built with the Ningbo–Taizhou–Wenzhou railway which began passenger service in 2009, but Taizhou South was not used until 2011.

It is one of the eastern terminuses of the Jinhua–Taizhou railway.

References 

Railway stations in Zhejiang